Lee Myung-woo is a South Korean television director best known for his works on Seoul Broadcasting System (SBS) television series, Punch (2014–2015), The Fiery Priest (2019) and Backstreet Rookie (2020). In January 2021, he established the production company The Studio M.

Filmography 
One Ordinary Day (Coupang Play, 2021) - Director
Backstreet Rookie (SBS, 2020) - Director
The Fiery Priest (SBS, 2019) - Director
Whisper (SBS, 2017)  - Director
Punch (SBS, 2014–2015) - Director
You're All Surrounded (SBS, 2014) - Director
Two Women's Room (SBS, 2013–2014) - Director
Fashion King (SBS, 2012) - Director
Warrior Baek Dong-soo (SBS, 2011)
Ja Myung Go (SBS, 2009)
Bad Couple (SBS, 2007)

Awards 
2019 International Drama Festival in Tokyo: Special Award for Foreign Drama (The Fiery Priest)
2019 46th Korea Broadcasting Awards: Best Mid-Length TV Drama (The Fiery Priest)
2019 14th Seoul International Drama Awards: Hallyu Drama Top Excellence Award (The Fiery Priest)
2015 Korean Broadcasting Critic's Association Critic's Circle Awards: Best TV Drama (Punch)
2015 Yoido Club Broadcaster of the Year: PD Award (Punch)
2015 42nd Korea Broadcasting Awards: Best Mid-Length TV Drama (Punch)

References

External links 
  
 
 

1972 births
Living people
South Korean television directors